The 2015 Superbike World Championship was the twenty-eighth season of the Superbike World Championship. Jonathan Rea became 2015 World Superbike Champion.

Race calendar and results

Entry list

All entries used Pirelli tyres.

Championship standings

Riders' championship

Bold – Pole positionItalics – Fastest lap

Manufacturers' championship

Notes

References

External links

Superbike World Championship seasons
World